Washington Grove is a passenger rail station in Washington Grove, Maryland, on MARC Train's Brunswick Line. The station serves a historic community near Washington, D.C. that was a summer retreat for many of its citizens during the nineteenth and twentieth centuries, but that recently have become year-round residences without destroying the outward appearance of the original structures in the community. Originally the rail connection provided the transportation to the community, which is designed only for pedestrian use along footpaths.

Station layout
The station is not compliant with the Americans with Disabilities Act of 1990, lacking raised platforms for level boarding.

References

External links
 Washington Grove station official website

Brunswick Line
Former Baltimore and Ohio Railroad stations
Railway stations in Montgomery County, Maryland
MARC Train stations